The Cleveland National Air Show is an annual air show held on Labor Day weekend at Burke Lakefront Airport in Cleveland, Ohio. It was established in 1964 as an indirect successor to the National Air Races. The show includes stunt airplanes, modern fighters and alternates between the U.S. Navy Blue Angels and U.S. Air Force Thunderbirds every other year. The show typically runs from 9:00 a.m. to around 4:30 p.m. EDT. The show usually starts with smaller acts, and the Blue Angels or Thunderbirds  perform last. Another regular attraction is the NASA Glenn Research Center, which usually has an exhibit located near the back of the show. There is usually some type of heritage or legacy flight, sometimes both.

There was no show in 2020 due to the ongoing COVID-19 pandemic.

Performers 
This section is a list of all aircraft that have performed in the Cleveland National Airshow in recent history. Please note that only the acts are listed, not static displays or other ground attractions.

2015
 U.S. Air Force Thunderbirds
 Boeing F/A-18E Super Hornet
 C-130 Hercules
 C-17 Globemaster
 Sean Tucker 
 North American P-51 Mustang
 North American B-25 Mitchell

2014
U.S. Navy Blue Angels
Unmanned Aircraft Systems Demonstration
Nasa Glenn
Northern Ohio Unmanned Aircraft Systems Association (NOUASA)
Art Nalls' Sea Harrier and L-39 Black Jet

2013
The 2013 Cleveland National Air Show was canceled due to the federal sequester.

2012
U.S. Navy Blue Angels
USMC Fat Albert (C-130 Hercules)
US Army Golden Knights
F/A-18F Super Hornet
Sky Soldiers Cobra Helicopter Demonstration Team (AH-1 Cobra)
Sean Tucker (Oracle Challenger II)
Mike Goulian Aerosports
Jane Wicker
Shockwave Jet Truck
Aurora Stearman
B-17 Flying Fortress "Yankee Lady"
Jim Leavelle (T-6 Texan)
Metro Life Flight (Eurocopter EC-145)
US Air Force Heritage Flight (F-22 Raptor and P-51)

2011

U.S. Air Force Thunderbirds
US Army Golden Knights
A-10 Thunderbolt II
F/A-18 Hornet
F-4 Phantom II
P-51 Mustang
CP-140 Aurora
Jason Newburg- Viper Airshows 
USAF Heritage Flight
Jacquie B Airshows
Kent Pietsch Jelly Belly 
Jim "Fang" Maroney 
School Time Jet Bus 
John Klatt (Staudacher S-300D)
B-17 Flying Fortress "Memphis Belle"
Metro Life Flight Eurocopter EC-145

2010

U.S. Navy Blue Angels
USMC Fat Albert (C-130 Hercules)
US Army Golden Knights
F/A-18F Super Hornet
 U.S. Navy Legacy Flight
F-15E Strike Eagle
Red Eagle Air Sports (Pitts Special)
Gene Soucy (Grumman Ag Cat)
Teresa Stokes Wingwalking
B-17 Flying Fortress "Yankee Lady"
Mitsubishi A6M Zero "TORA 101"
Shockwave Jet Truck
Mad Bomber Pyrotechnics and Wall of Fire 
Metro Life Flight Eurocopter EC-145
TS-11 Iskra

2009

U.S. Air Force Thunderbirds
AV-8B Harrier II
F-15E Strike Eagle
A-10 Thunderbolt II
USCG HH-65C Dolphin
C-130 Hercules
KC-135 Stratotanker
Skip Stewart (Pitts S2S)
Franklin's Flying Circus (Waco UPF-7)
John Klatt (Staudacher S-300D)
AH-64 Apache
B-17 Flying Fortress "Memphis Belle"
TS-11 Iskra
US Army Golden Knights
Cleveland Aeromodeling Society
USAF Heritage Flight
Metro Life Flight Eurocopter EC-145
Shockwave Jet Truck

2008

U.S. Navy Blue Angels
F/A-18F Super Hornet
F-15C Eagle
F-16C Fighting Falcon
C-130 Hercules
Red Star & Dragon 
B-17 Flying Fortress "Yankee Lady"
John Mohr Barnstorming (Stearman PT-17)
Silent Wings (Alisport Silent-J)
Nikolay Timofeev (Sukhoi Su-26)
Sean Tucker (Oracle Challenger II)
TS-11 Iskra
Cleveland Aeromodeling Society
US Army Golden Knights
USN Legacy Flight
USAF Heritage Flight
Metro Life Flight Sikorsky S-76
Shockwave Jet Truck

2007
U.S. Air Force Thunderbirds
F/A-18F Super Hornet
F-15E Strike Eagle
C-17 Globemaster III
F-86 Sabre
C-130 Hercules
Julie Clark T-34 Mentor
John Klatt (Staudacher S-300D)
Sean Tucker (Oracle Challenger II)
TS-11 Iskra
USAF Heritage Flight
Shockwave Jet truck
Metro Life Flight Sikorsky S-76

2006

U.S. Navy Blue Angels
A-10 Thunderbolt II
F-22 Raptor
B-1 Lancer
F-117 Nighthawk
USAF Heritage Flight
C-130 Hercules
US Army Golden Knights
The Red Knight (T-33 Shooting Star)
TS-11 Iskra
Shockwave Jet Truck
Greg Poe (Ethanoledge 540)
Walt Pierce
B-25 Mitchell "Panchito"
Supermarine Spitfire
F4U Corsair
Metro Life Flight Sikorsky S-76
Cleveland Aeromodeling Society

2005
U.S. Air Force Thunderbirds
A-10 Thunderbolt II
B-1 Lancer
USAF Heritage Flight
F/A-18F Super Hornet
USN Legacy Flight
C-130 Hercules
US Army Golden Knights
Sean Tucker (Pitts SpecialI)
Matt Chapman (Lycoming CAP 580)
Michael Mancuso (Extra 300)
Shockwave Jet Truck
B-17 Flying Fortress "Yankee Lady"
B-25 Mitchell "Yankee Warrior"
C-47 Skytrain "Yankee Doodle Dandy"
Metro Life Flight Sikorsky S-76
Cleveland Aeromodeling Society
Sky Busters Rocketry Club

2004
F-16 Fighting Falcon
F/A-18 Hornet
USAF Heritage Flight
USN Legacy Flight
P-51 Mustang
F4U Corsair
B-1 Lancer
C-17 Globemaster III
C-130 Hercules
US Army Golden Knights
B-25 Mitchell "Panchito"
B-17 Flying Fortress "Memphis Belle"
Shockwave Jet truck
Jim Leroy (Pitts S2S)
US Jet Aerobatic Team
Jimmy Franklin (Waco biplane)
Steve Coan (Windex 1200)
Kyle Franklin Jet Wingwalking
Metro Life Flight Sikorsky S-76
Cleveland Aeromodeling Society
Sky Busters Rocketry Club

2003
U.S. Navy Blue Angels
US Army Golden Knights
F-16 Fighting Falcon
F-14 Tomcat
Firebirds Delta Team
Debbie Gary (SF 260 Marchetti)
F4U Corsair
P-51 Mustang
Hawker Sea Fury
US Air Force Reserve Jet Cars
Classic Air Racers
P-38 Lightning
P-40 Warhawk
F6F Hellcat
Metro Life Flight Sikorsky S-76
Cleveland Aeromodeling Society

2002
U.S. Air Force Thunderbirds
US Army Golden Knights
A-10 Thunderbolt II
F-14 Tomcat
CF-18 Hornet
AeroShell Aerobatics (T-6 Texan)
Hispano HA-200
Learjet 23
Beech 18
Sukhoi Su-31
Shockwave Jet Truck
Lockheed Constellation
Martin 404
Douglas DC-3
Ford Tri-Motor
Air Racing
B-25 Mitchell
Cleveland Aeromodeling Society

2001
U.S. Navy Blue Angels
US Army Golden Knights
A-10 Thunderbolt II
CF-18 Hornet
C-130 Hercules
B-1 Lancer
C-17 Globemaster III
Swift Magic aerobatic team
F-86 Sabre
MiG-15
Aero L-39
Bob & Pat Wagner (Boeing-Stearman Model 75)
Jim "Bulldog" Leroy (Pitts S2S)
Dan Buchanan ("Flying Colors" hangliding)
Bee Gee replica
Walt Linscott
Ian Groom (Sukhoi Su-31)
Cleveland Aeromodeling Society

2000
US Air Force Thunderbirds
CASPA Challenge Series
F-14 Tomcat
F-15 Eagle
F/A-18 Hornet
RAF Hawker Siddeley Nimrod
YAK-55
Greg Poe (Zivko Edge)
Gene Soucy (Extra 300)
Sean Tucker (Pitts Special)
Showcopters (Robinson R22)
Shockwave Jet truck
F4U Corsair
B-29 Superfortress "Fifi"
B-24 Liberator "Diamond Lil"
B-25 Mitchell
B-17 Flying Fortress

1999

U.S. Navy Blue Angels
CASPA Challenge Series
Sean Tucker Pitts Special
US Army Golden Knights
F-14 Tomcat
F-16 Fighting Falcon
P-51 Mustang
RAF Hawker Siddeley Nimrod
SNJ-2
Kyle Franklin Waco UPF-7
Walt Linscott YAK-55
Bob Correll's Kitecycle
Metro Life Flight Sikorsky S-76

Accidents and incidents related to air show
 September 8, 1981: Departing Cleveland after three successful shows, a T-38 Talon from the United States Air Force Thunderbirds, ingested birds shortly after take off.  The Thunderbirds Commander/Leader, Lt Col David "DL" Smith ("Thunderbird 1") and his Crew Chief, SSgt Dwight Roberts, both ejected.  However, Lt Col Smith's parachute did not open and he died upon impact with the shoreline.  SSgt Roberts survived, and was quickly retrieved from Lake Erie.
 September 6, 2009: A TS-11 Iskra practicing for the air show made a gear up landing. The pilot was unharmed and the aircraft received only light damage to the cowling and left wing.

References

External links

Cleveland National Air Show

Air shows in the United States
Festivals in Cleveland
Recurring events established in 1964
1964 establishments in Ohio
Aviation in Ohio
Annual events in Ohio